is a subprefecture of Hokkaido Prefecture, Japan.  Kushiro is home to a population of red-crowned cranes, estimated in 2022 to number about 1,900.

Geography

Municipalities

Mergers

History 
November, 1897: Kushiro Subprefecture established.
August, 1922: Renamed Kushironokuni Subprefecture (釧路国支庁).
October 20, 1948: Ashoro District transferred to Tokachi Subprefecture.
April 1, 1957: Name returned to Kushiro Subprefecture.

References

External links
Official Website 

Subprefectures in Hokkaido